Mohamed Jarragh (born 10 November 1981) is a Kuwaiti footballer who plays in midfield for his club Al Arabi and the Kuwait national football team.  Jarragh was born at Madina-al-Kuwayt. He is known as the Mystro in central midfielder.

References

1981 births
Living people
Kuwaiti footballers
Kuwaiti people of Iranian descent
Al-Arabi SC (Kuwait) players
Sportspeople from Kuwait City
Kuwait international footballers
Footballers at the 2002 Asian Games
Association football midfielders
Asian Games competitors for Kuwait
Al Salmiya SC players
Kuwait Premier League players
21st-century Kuwaiti people